Try Again may refer to:

"Try Again" (Aaliyah song), 2000
"Try Again" (Champaign song), 1983
"Try Again" (Dilba song), 2011
"Try Again" (Keane song), 2006
"Try Again" (Mai Kuraki song), 2013
"Try Again", a song by Big Star from #1 Record, 1972
"Try Again", a song by Dean Martin, 1954
"Try Again", a song by Kip Moore from Slowheart, 2017
"Try Again", a song by Patsy Cline, 1957
"Try Again", a song by Supertramp from Supertramp, 1970
"Try Again", a song by Teyana Taylor from The Album, 2020
"Try Again", a song by Westlife from Westlife, 1999

See also
Try, Try Again (disambiguation)

English phrases